Baby Jane may refer to:

Books
 What Ever Happened to Baby Jane (novel), a 1960 novel by Henry Farrell
 Baby Jane, a novel by Finnish writer Sofi Oksanen

Persons
 Baby Jane Holzer (Jane Bruckenfeld, 1940), American actress, and model for Andy Warhol appearing in Soap Opera (1964), Couch (1964), and Camp (1965)
 Juanita Quigley (1931–2017), American actress billed as "Baby Jane" in several early roles

Film, television and video games
 What Ever Happened to Baby Jane (1962 film), a film based on the novel, starring Bette Davis and Joan Crawford
 What Ever Happened to Baby Jane (1991 film), a remake based on the novel, starring Vanessa Redgrave and Lynn Redgrave
 Baby Jane Hudson, a character from the above work
 Baby Jane, a Splicer model in the video games BioShock and BioShock 2

Music
"Baby Jane", song from Midnight Rave With The Pleazers EP written Dello, Cane
 "Baby Jane" (Rod Stewart song), 1983 
 "Baby Jane" (Dr. Feelgood song), 1977 
 Baby Jane (EP), an EP by Honey Is Cool
 Baby Jane, Christina Aguilera's alias for the 2006 album Back to Basics